Svenska Cupen 2006 was the fifty-first season of the main Swedish football Cup. The competition started on 17 March 2006 and concluded on 11 November 2006 with the Final, held at Råsunda Stadium, Solna Municipality in Stockholms län. Helsingborgs IF won the final 2–0 against Gefle IF before an attendance of 3,379.

First round
The 34 matches were played between 17 March and 8 April 2006. There were 68 teams in the first round from Division 1, Division 2 and Division 3, but also including a few teams from Division 4 and Division 5.

!colspan="3"|17 March 2006

|-
!colspan="3"|26 March 2006

|-
!colspan="3"|28 March 2006

|-
!colspan="3"|30 March 2006

|-
!colspan="3"|1 April 2006

|-
!colspan="3"|2 April 2006

|-
!colspan="3"|5 April 2006

|-
!colspan="3"|6 April 2006

|-
!colspan="3"|8 April 2006

|}
1Topkapi Konya KIF withdrew from the competition.

Second round
In this round the 34 winning teams from the previous round were joined by 30 teams from Allsvenskan and Superettan.  The 32 matches were played between 12 April and 18 May 2006.

!colspan="3"|12 April 2006

|-
!colspan="3"|13 April 2006

|-
!colspan="3"|14 April 2006

|-
!colspan="3"|17 April 2006

|-
!colspan="3"|18 April 2006

|-
!colspan="3"|19 April 2006

|-
!colspan="3"|20 April 2006

|-
!colspan="3"|29 April 2006

|-
!colspan="3"|4 May 2006

|-
!colspan="3"|17 May 2006

|-
!colspan="3"|18 May 2006

|}

Third round
The 16 matches in this round were played between 16 May and 6 July 2006

!colspan="3"|16 May 2006

|-
!colspan="3"|17 May 2006

|-
!colspan="3"|18 May 2006

|-
!colspan="3"|7 June 2006

|-
!colspan="3"|8 June 2006

|-
!colspan="3"|28 June 2006

|-
!colspan="3"|6 July 2006

|}

Fourth round
The 8 matches in this round were played between 22 June and 27 July 2006.

!colspan="3"|22 June 2006

|-
!colspan="3"|6 July 2006

|-
!colspan="3"|26 July 2006

|-
!colspan="3"|27 July 2006

|}

Quarter-finals
The 4 matches in this round were played between 3 August and 31 August 2006.

!colspan="3"|3 August 2006

|-
!colspan="3"|19 August 2006

|-
!colspan="3"|31 August 2006

|}

Semi-finals
The semi-finals were played on 19 October 2006.

!colspan="3"|19 October 2006

|}

Final

The final was played on 11 November 2006 at the Råsunda Stadium.

Footnotes

External links 
 Svenska Cupen 2006 - Svenskfotboll.se - Official Website
  Svenska Cupen 2006 – everysport.com
  Sweden Cup 2006 - rsssf.com

2006
Cupen
2006 domestic association football cups